Mauro Belotti (born 13 May 1984) is an Italian footballer who plays as a defender for A.S.D.P. Ciliverghe di Mazzano.

Club career
Born in Trescore Balneario, the Province of Bergamo, Belotti started his career at hometown club Atalanta Bergamo and finished as 2001–02 Campionato Nazionale Primavera runner-up. He was the right midfielder of the team.

Belotti was awarded no.33 of the first team in 2003–04 season. But remained as a player of the youth team. In January 2004, he left for Prato and joined Primavera teammate Gabriele Perico. In summer 2004, he was signed by Serie B side AlbinoLeffe along with Perico and Alessandro Diamanti from Prato. The Province of Bergamo based club, also signed Primavera teammate Joelson (in co-ownership deal) and Mauro Minelli (on loan) from Atalanta.

In the same transfer window, he was loaned back to Prato for a season. In 2005–06 season, he was awarded no.33 shirt of AlbinoLeffe but failed to make any league appearances. he then left for Pergocrema and Pavia.

His no.33 shirt was taken by Francesco Renzetti in 2008–09 season, made him without a club number, and Belotti left for Lega Pro (ex-Serie C) again in January 2009, this time for South Tyrol.

In 2009–10 season, he left for Lega Pro Seconda Divisione side Rodengo Saiano.

In 2011–12 season he plays in the Savona files; the following year he joined AlbinoLeffe.

Since the summer of 2013 will play for three seasons, for Lumezzane.

In July 2016 he was hired by the amateur team Folgore Caratese; on 17 January 2017 back in professional football moved to Pro Piacenza.

International career
Belotti was the member of Italy U16 squad at 2001 UEFA European Under-16 Football Championship (now a U-17 event). He also won 2003 UEFA European Under-19 Football Championship, which the team included Atalanta teammate Giampaolo Pazzini, Gabriele Perico and Simone Padoin.

In 2005, he was called to Italy U-21 B team specially for 2005 Mediterranean Games and for a preparation match against Serie D Best XI before the tournament. He played his only match with the team against Libya.

References

External links
 Football.it Profile 
 FIGC National Team data 
 
 

1984 births
Living people
Italian footballers
Italy youth international footballers
Serie C players
Serie D players
Atalanta B.C. players
A.C. Prato players
U.C. AlbinoLeffe players
U.S. Pergolettese 1932 players
F.C. Pavia players
A.C. Rodengo Saiano players
F.C. Lumezzane V.G.Z. A.S.D. players
F.C. Südtirol players
Savona F.B.C. players
U.S. Folgore Caratese A.S.D. players
A.S. Pro Piacenza 1919 players
Association football defenders
Sportspeople from the Province of Bergamo
Competitors at the 2005 Mediterranean Games
Mediterranean Games competitors for Italy
People from Trescore Balneario
Footballers from Lombardy